The 1958 Florida A&M Rattlers football team was an American football team that represented Florida A&M University as a member of the Southern Intercollegiate Athletic Conference (SIAC) during the 1958 NCAA College  Division football season. In their 14th season under head coach Jake Gaither, the Rattlers compiled a 7–2 record, won the SIAC championship, and outscored opponents by a total of 263 to 135.  The team played its home games at Bragg Memorial Stadium in Tallahassee, Florida.

The Rattlers lost to undefeated black college national champion Prairie View A&M in the Orange Blossom Classic. 

The team's statistical leaders included Leroy Hardee with 704 rushing yards, 99 receiving yards, and 52 points scored, and Lee Royster with 269 passing yards.

Schedule

References

Florida AandM
Florida A&M Rattlers football seasons
Florida AandM Rattlers football